The 2013 Middle East Rally Championship season is an international rally championship sanctioned by the FIA. The championship is contested over seven events held in seven countries across the Middle East region, running from January to December.

Reigning champion Nasser Al-Attiyah successfully retained the championship with an event in hand after taking victories in Qatar, Kuwait, Jordan and Cyprus and finishing second in Lebanon. He would go on to win Dubai as well. Al-Attiyah scored more than double the points of second placed driver, Khalid Al-Qassimi. Al-Qassimi finished second in Qatar, Kuwait and Cyprus and finished third in Jordan. Third place went to Abdulaziz Al-Kuwari who finished third in Qatar, Kuwait and Cyprus as well as a fourth place in Jordan.

The only driver to defeat Al-Attiyah in a rally this year, Roger Feghali who won in Lebanon, is not a championship competitor.

Race calendar and results

The 2013 MERC is as follows:

Championship standings
The 2013 MERC for Drivers points is as follows:

References

External links
Official website

Middle East Rally Championship
Middle East
Middle East Rally Championship